Metropolitan Meat Market, primarily known as Meat Market, in Melbourne, Australia, is a former market building that also incorporates the Metropolitan Hotel. It was designed by George Johnson and completed in 1874. It has been listed on the Victorian Heritage Register since 1973.

The venue has undergone many iterations and currently serves as an arts venue under the City of Melbourne. Annually, the venue hosts cultural and social events ranging from theatre, circus, dance to food and wine fairs, music launches and private functions, in addition to festivals including Melbourne Fringe Festival, Melbourne Knowledge Week, and Yirramboi Festival.

History

Built in 1880, the Meat Market was originally conceived as a large-scale metropolitan trade space for meat vendors. The market ceased to trade in 1974. The building remained unused until 1977, when the property was acquired by the state government and transformed into an arts centre, inaugurated in 1979. The space functioned as an office and workshop with arts and craft organisations and artists. A 2004 refurbishment included more office space.

The City of Melbourne has developed the venue into a major arts and cultural space. Meat Market now houses over 50 individuals and arts businesses. Meat Market is an important hub for arts development and presentation within Melbourne’s arts scene, hosting hundreds of events each year including in Melbourne International Arts Festival, Melbourne Fringe Festival, Yirramboi and more.

Design and Construction 
Meat Market was designed by George R. Johnson in 1879. An emigrant from Edmonton, London, Johnson was chosen to design the new market because of his experience in designing the former Victoria Meat Market. He was also the architect of Hotham Town Hall (known now as Melbourne Town Hall) and Civic Buildings, where William Reynolds, said to be the moving spirit behind the building of Meat Market, officiated as Mayor in 1878. Johnson later went on to design a score of other buildings in the area, and designed modifications on Meat Market's layout before dying en route to Melbourne from died of blood poisoning in 1898. With six shareholders of the former Victoria Meat Market and two others, influential trader William Reynolds formed the Metropolitan Meat Market Company with a view to building on land on the corner of Courtney and Blackwood Streets. Ornamentations in the venue include Reynolds as the bewhiskered figure whose modelled head appears over the Courtney Street inside entrance doors, and the 1874 in the pediment above the Blackwood Street entrance is the foundation date of the Victoria Meat Market Company.

The building complex which Johnson designed for the Metropolitan Meat Market Company was an ambitious one, which it was proposed to complete in stages. The initial contract work, completed between September 1879 and December 1880, was to include the market hall itself for a length of thirteen bays from Courtney Street, with two additional bays projecting to the north; the offices fronting Courtney Street; and the hotel fronting both Blackwood and Courtney Streets but extending along Blackwood Street only so far north as it does at present, not up to the entrance gate.

It was decided during the course of the contract to proceed with the bank (now the Blackwood Street Gallery) and manager's quarters, on the north side of the Blackwood Street gate, and it is probable that the gate itself and the façade linking up to the hotel were also undertaken. It was decided by 1880 to put in hand the first of the shops, being that on the South side of the Blackwood Street gate and it appears that instead of providing a house attached to the shop, as originally intended, quarters for the market caretaker were incorporated. The entranceway between the Blackwood Street gate and the market hall proper was at this stage left unroofed. This work did not embrace the buildings fronting Blackwood Street to the north of the present courtyard all of which are of later date.

The 56 feet (17 metres) to the north of the bank were in 1889 leased to one Dunkerley for construction of a cooling chamber on what was actually described at the time as vacant ground. It appears that the construction of this was not proceeding satisfactorily and the Company intervened to carry out the work. G.R. Johnson was again commissioned and the new structure was given a façade harmonising with the existing building, though only one storey in height, and linked to them by a screen wall across in the front of a courtyard, now repurposed to the North Melbourne entrance.

Extensions and early use 

Connection of the buildings to the sewerage system in 1890  required substantial works and called for the employment of an architect, but Johnson was now dead.   The firm now commissioned was that of Gibbs and Finlay, originally established by Harry Browse Gibbs in 1882, and ultimately to become Gibbs, Finlay and Morsby.   This firm, and Gibbs in particular, was to be responsible for major extensions to the market in 1906–1908, when the main hall was continued north to Tyrone Street, increasing the number of stalls, but very precisely matching the original design. In Blackwood Street, next to the existing cooling chamber, a new chamber was built, and then a new entrance at the north end of the site, surmounted by a characteristically Edwardian elliptical rusticated arch.

The last major alterations to the buildings were made by Gibbs in the period 1918–1922, when it appears that the bank residence was modified to provide caretaker's quarters, an upper floor was built over Dunkerley's original freezing chamber to provide offices for the Master Butcher's Association, brick cooling chambers were built right along the western side of the market hall, and presumably at this time, a new range of cooling chambers inserted on the east side of the hall behind the Blackwood Street buildIngs.

Meat Market was not a unique institution. Not only did the official City Meat Market compare with it, but its predecessor, the Victorian Meat Market Company, continued in operation and there were occasional reports of other establishments such as the 'Victoria Meat Market', in Lygon Street, Carlton. It would appear that it was intended in 1879 to float the enterprise as a public company but whether because of lack of response or for other reasons, it remained private. Only after 1919, as a result of criticism in a report on meat trade practices, did the company go public for a few years. It was undoubtedly the most ambitious private market complex ever established in Melbourne and appears for many years to have been the only privately operated wholesale market of any substance.

The Metropolitan Meat Market Company continued to operate the market until June 1974, a total of ninety four years. The Managing Director of the Company in its final years was J.M. (Malcolm) Howlett, who was the son of James M. Howlett, who with his brother John T. Howlett commenced work with William Reynolds in the 1880s. Malcolm Howlett has remained keenly interested in the market since it became a Craft Centre and has in his writings about it, given us a clear picture of what it was like.

Auction and use as a craft centre 

The property was put up for auction on Tuesday 18 December 1973, at a boom time for real estate prices. It was known to be of interest to developers as a large area of land in close proximity to the city and a sale price of around one and a quarter million dollars was considered likely. The buildings were already classified by the National Trust as of historical importance and worthy of preservation and the Historical Buildings Preservation Council now became involved, registering the Market seventeen days prior to the auction. Since this meant that it could not be demolished, the highest likely bidders were no longer interested and the property was passed in at auction for nine hundred and twenty five thousand dollars.

The market remained unsold for nearly three years. During this time it was leased for a number of purposes, a disposals warehouse, auction room, trash and treasure market and car park. A number of groups and individuals looked at it with various commercial operations in mind, but none appeared to be economically viable.

Early in 1975 glass artist David Wright went to Marjorie Johnson who was Executive Officer of the Craft Association of Victoria, then operating from first floor rooms in North Melbourne, and suggested to her that the old meat market, also in North Melbourne, would make a great craft centre. The timing was perfect. The Craft Association was finding it very difficult in a building without a lift to transport all the equipment they used for their craft promotional events in public places, such as the Fitzroy Gardens. Marjorie was at the time lobbying the Victorian Ministry for the Arts for more suitable premises for the Craft Association.

A group comprising David Wright, Marjorie Johnson, Ian Sprague, Sue Walker, Colin Burroughs and John Mitchell thoroughly inspected the property and reported back to the Craft Association Executive that the market would indeed be as suitable as any building ever likely to come up for recycling.

The Craft Association authorised Marjorie to put a submission to Dr. Eric Westbrook, then Director of the Victorian Ministry for the Arts, for the purchase of the market as the centre of the crafts in Victoria. Early talks with the Ministry suggested little possibility of success and there was also fear that a case before the Historical Buildings Preservation Council by the Metropolitan Meat Market Company for deregistration might be successful and the market would be lost. Very fortunately, the hearing of this case and the counter claim by the Victorian Ministry for the Arts through its officer Essie Wicks, found in favour of keeping the market on the H.B.P.C. register. When continuing representation for purchase to the Ministry throughout 1975 and into 1976 appeared to be making no progress, invitations were issued to a broadly representative group to meet to plan a campaign of action. This group first met on 26 May 1976. Some of its most committed members, David Wright, Wally Curran, Marjorie Johnson, Gordon Jackson, Ian Sprague and Nola Hjorth, met again, under the Chairmanship of David Wright, to consider possible courses of action open to it. However shortly thereafter the then Premier, Minister of the Arts and Treasurer, The Hon. Rupert Hamer, agreed that the Ministry for the Arts would fund an architectural feasibility study on the proposal to convert the market into a Craft Centre for Victoria. Architects engaged to undertake the study were Genser Shepherd and Associates of Punt Road, Richmond, with whom Marjorie Johnson worked over the next few months in the development of the feasibility study. The historical architectural data in this brief history is all taken from the Genser Shepherd study.

Government purchase 
Soon after the receipt of the completed study, The Hon. Rupert Hamer, agreed that his Government would purchase Meat Market. In January 1977 the purchase was finalised at a cost of $890,000 and Meat Market on its various titles became Crown allotment No.21 section 11 at North Melbourne. Throughout 1977 and most of 1978, an interim committee and later a planning committee established by the Victorian Ministry for the Arts, met monthly to monitor basic building repairs, review tenancies, invite public response, investigate funding, examine alternative management structures, develop a philosophy for the Centre, assess applications for space and make recommendations to the Ministry for the Arts in relation to all of these matters. These final recommendations were submitted in September 1978 and in May 1979. The Hon. R.J. Hamer appointed Marjorie Johnson, who had just completed a two-year term as Festival Manager of Arts Victoria: Crafts, as Interim Manager with a brief to get Meat Market open as a Craft Centre. Approval had been given the previous year for three events of the Festival: "Australian Crafts '78", and a Glass Exhibition and Workshop, to be held in the market. For six months the Interim Manager and the resident caretaker were the only two occupants of the buildings with the former engaged in planning to open some time after the State Budget was brought down in September, providing that budget allowed for an allocation to the proposed Craft Centre. Following a one-off event, a Trade Fair organised by the Victorian Ceramic Group, held on 22–23 September 1979, the Craft Centre finally opened on a permanent basis on 8 November 1979. The Victorian State Craft Collection was on display in the front of the market hall and an exhibition of work by Melbourne State College Crafts students was at the rear.
 
At this time also the first Board of Management was approved by the Minister for the Arts, then The Hon. Norman Lacy, and appointed under the Crown Land (Reserves) Act 1978 as a Committee of Management charged with the responsibility of administering the Crown Reserve as a Craft Centre.

In March the following year (1980) this Committee became the Board of Directors of a Company Limited by Guarantee. Also that year, the position of General Manager was advertised and Marjorie Johnson applied for it and was appointed. The first task of The Board of Directors, under the Chairmanship of Judge John Campton was to develop a policy and objectives for the Centre and a range of activities which would give effect to those objectives. Their policy statement, published in September 1980, called for access workshops for all craft disciplines, individual workshops for rental to craftspeople, premises for craft groups, a crafts shop, changing exhibitions, an access gallery, a conference centre and the Victorian State Craft Collection display.

The state of the building and the level of the annual grant in those early years allowed for only an exhibitions program, display of the State Collection and operation of the Blackwood Street Gallery. In 1981, The Hon. Rupert Hamer, who was now Minister for Tourism, approved a direct grant to the Centre to enable the setting up of the crafts shop with the important objective of providing high quality Australian Crafts to the tourist market. In 1982 with specified funding from the Victorian Ministry for the Arts, and the Crafts Board of the Australia Council, the Ceramic and Textile Access Workshops were established.

This was now as far as development could go until funding was available to convert large sections of the building, whose condition rendered them unfit for anything at all. The announcement by The Hon. Race Mathews, Minister for the Arts, in November 1983 of $1,320,000 for the first phase building works followed by second and third phase works totaling $2,500,000 allowed for the complete restoration and conversion of the former Meat Market, so that all the projected activities of the 1980 plan could be realised.

Current Use 

In 1998, Meat Market began being used as a creative and performing arts space. Followed by significant renovations in 2005, a dedicated management team was appointed in 2015. Now, over 50 businesses and individuals operate from the site. Meat Market has five spaces available for hire to the arts and the public, including the Flat Floor Pavilion, Cobblestone Pavilion, Meeting Room, Old Cafe and Stables. Meat Market is also one of few venues for hire in Melbourne featuring a circus truss, accommodating aerial and circus performances in the Cobblestone Pavilion.

Meat Market also houses over 50 practitioners as 'licensees' - creative tenants which have a presence within the building. Licensees include a variety of creative outlets, including administrative offices for other arts organisations encompassing music and dance. Current and notable licensees include Indigenous arts Ilbijerri Theatre Company, Melbourne Jazz Festival and Next Wave Festival.

Notable events 
 Emerald City as part of Melbourne Fringe Festival
 Junipalooza
 7 May to 13 May 2018 - Melbourne Knowledge Week Hub
 Mould: A Cheese Festival
 25 July 2018 - First MTV Unplugged Melbourne with Gang of Youths
26 July 2018 - Second MTV Unplugged Melbourne with Amy Shark
 13 August 2018 - TedxMelbourne 2018: The Great Unknown
20 October 2018 - Broadsheet Melbourne and Connoisseur Ice Cream's Discovery Festival 
23 to 25 November 2018 - Melbourne Music Week: Melbourne Synth Festival

References

Marjorie Johnson O.A.M., General Manager. 14 July 1986

External links
 - Meat Market Main Pavilion

Heritage-listed buildings in Melbourne
Market halls
Theatres in Melbourne
Buildings and structures in the City of Melbourne (LGA)
Buildings and structures completed in 1880
1880 establishments in Australia